The 2020–21 Burundi Ligue A season, also known as the Primus Ligue for sponsorship reasons, was the 58th edition of the top flight football competition in Burundi. The season began on 5 September 2020 and ended on 23 May 2021.

Teams 
A total of sixteen clubs participate in this season. Thirteen teams from previous season and three new promoted sides.

Promoted from Ligue B
 Muzinga
 Royal de Muramvya
 Les Eléphants

Relegated from Ligue A
 LLB Sport 4 Africa
 Ngozi City
 Les Lierres

Stadiums and locations

League table

References

Burundi Premier League seasons
Premier League
Premier League
Burundi
Burundi